Streptomyces wedmorensis is a bacterium species from the genus of Streptomyces which has been isolated from soil in Pennsylvania in the United States. Streptomyces wedmorensis produces (S)-2-hydroxypropylphosphonic acid epoxidase, fosfomycin and phosphonomycin B.

See also 
 List of Streptomyces species

References

Further reading

External links
Type strain of Streptomyces wedmorensis at BacDive – the Bacterial Diversity Metadatabase

wedmorensis
Bacteria described in 1986